Muazu was Sultan of Sokoto from 6 April 1877 to 26 September 1881. He was the son of Sultan Muhammed Bello and his wife, Aisha bin Umar al-Kammu.

Life
Muazu lived in Sokoto town before his election and was the first Sultan not to command a ribat on the frontier. He was picked as Sultan over his brother Sa'id based on his seniority. During his reign, he faced a hostile Sabon Birni which Bawa, the emir of Gobir and previous Sultans had subdued, he concentrated on retaking the town but was unsuccessful.

References

Sultans of Sokoto